Somerset State Hospital was a Pennsylvania State Mental Health Hospital, located outside Somerset, about 70 miles east of Pittsburgh. The hospital, closed in 1995, was converted into a minimum-security correctional facility housing older males with geriatric/mentally challenging issues.

See also
 State Correctional Institution – Laurel Highlands

References

Defunct hospitals in Pennsylvania
Hospitals established in 1938
Hospitals disestablished in 1995